Beeston Hill is a settlement on the island of Saint Croix in the United States Virgin Islands. Beeston Hill is little more than a small hamlet, lying along Route 70.

References

Populated places in Saint Croix, U.S. Virgin Islands